Dwight is a masculine first name that comes from an English surname which was in turn derived from the medieval feminine name Diot, a diminutive of Dionysia, the feminine form of Dionysios.  The name is mainly given in the United States and Caribbean  countries (see below).

Notable people 

 Dwight D. Eisenhower, (1890–1969), five-star general and 34th President of the United States
 Dwight B. LaDu, (1876-1954), American engineer and surveyor in New York
 Dwight L. Moody, American evangelist and publisher
 W. Dwight Pierce (1881-1967), American entomologist
 Dwight York, American musician and imprisoned leader of the Nuwaubian movement 

Artists and entertainers
 Dwight Schultz, American stage, television and film actor
 Dwight Tosh, American state legislator
 Dwight Twilley, American singer
 Dwight Yoakam, American country musician
 Dwight York, stand-up comedian

Athletes
 Dwight Anderson, American professional basketball player
 Dwight Anderson, Jamaican-born professional Canadian football player
 Dwight Barnett, Jamaican footballer
 Dwight F. Davis, American tennis player
 Dwight Ferguson, Bahamian sprint athlete
 Dwight Freeney, American football player
 Dwight Gooden, American baseball player
 Dwight Howard, American NBA professional basketball player
 Dwight McDonald, American football player
 Dwight Peabody, American football player
 Dwight Qawi, American boxer
 Dwight White, American football player
 Dwight Yorke, Trinidad and Tobago footballer

Fictional characters

Dwight, a character from The Walking Dead franchise
Dwight Enys, doctor in Winston Graham’s Poldark novels, who debuts in its second book.
Dwight Fairfield, fictional character from the video game Dead by Daylight
Dwight McCarthy, fictional character in Sin City
 Dwight "Dewey" Riley, a lead character in the Scream (film series)
Dwight Schrute, fictional character in the American TV show The Office
Dwight Hendrickson, in the TV series Haven
Dwight Walker, birth name of Lucious Lyon, a fictional character from the television series Empire

References 

Masculine given names
English masculine given names